Lisa Suzanne Blount (July 1, 1957 – October 27, 2010) was an American film and television actress, and Academy Award-winning producer.

Early life
Blount was born in Fayetteville, Arkansas, to Margaret Louise Martin and Glen Roscoe Blount, and was raised in Jacksonville, Arkansas. After graduating from Jacksonville High School and studying theatre at the University of Arkansas at Little Rock, and Valdosta State University in Georgia, she landed several small television roles. She returned to college in 1986, this time at San Francisco State University (SFSU), where she completed her degree in Theater Arts and spent the 1986/1987 academic year competing on SFSU's Forensics (Speech and Debate) Team. In the fall of 1987, she was cast as the female lead in the American Conservatory Theater's highly successful revival of the musical Hair.

Career
Blount received a Golden Globe nomination for new star of the year for her performance in An Officer and a Gentleman, and she acted in the 1987 cult horror film Prince of Darkness. Another memorable role was that of Jim Profit's outrageous stepmother Bobbi Stakowski in the short-lived television series Profit. She appeared in season two of Moonlighting in the episode "Sleep Talkin' Guy" (1986).

Blount later became a producer, and with her husband Ray McKinnon, won the Academy Award in 2001 for best live action short film for the film The Accountant. That film also credits her as wardrobe mistress. Blount produced and acted in Chrystal, which starred  Billy Bob Thornton.

Death
Blount was found dead in her home in Little Rock, Arkansas by her mother on October 27, 2010. The coroner told the Arkansas Democrat-Gazette that Blount appeared to have died two days earlier. No foul play was suspected, according to the Pulaski County coroner.

Although the coroner did not release an official cause of death, Blount's mother told RadarOnline.com that her daughter had had idiopathic thrombocytopenic purpura (ITP), in which low levels of platelets keep blood from clotting and lead to bleeding and bruising. "I think that might have been part of the problem when she passed away because when I found her she had a purple look on her neck that looked like blood on the surface".

Filmography

References

External links
 
 
 

1957 births
2010 deaths
Jacksonville High School (Arkansas) alumni
People from Fayetteville, Arkansas
American film actresses
American film producers
American television actresses
Actresses from Little Rock, Arkansas
Valdosta State University alumni
Directors of Live Action Short Film Academy Award winners
20th-century American actresses
21st-century American actresses
Deaths from blood disease
American women film producers